Jan Lars Svartvik (born 18 August 1931) is a Swedish linguist and former professor of English at Lund University (1970–1995). He is the author of several grammar books on English that are widely used in teaching English in Sweden. One of his research areas is also corpus linguistics.

He is a member of the Royal Swedish Academy of Sciences and of the Royal Physiographic Society in the city of Lund.

Jesper Svartvik (born 1965), theologian, is his son.

Bibliography
English Pocket Grammar (1974)
English University Grammar (1978)
A Comprehensive Grammar of the English Language (with Randolph Quirk, Sidney Greenbaum, and Geoffrey Leech) (1985)
English Words on Board (1994)
English - Island language, World Language, Trending Language (1999)

Prizes and awards

August Prize in Literature (1999)

See also
A Comprehensive Grammar of the English Language
 Survey of English Usage

Notes

External links
 The Survey of English Usage website
 www.muni.cz

1931 births
Corpus linguists
Linguists from Sweden
Living people
Male non-fiction writers
Members of the Royal Physiographic Society in Lund
Members of the Royal Swedish Academy of Sciences
Swedish non-fiction writers
August Prize winners
Swedish scholars and academics
Linguists of English

sv:Jan Svartvik